Alexander Blake may refer to:

Alexander Blake (MP) (1650), English MP for Peterborough
Alexander Blake (cricketer) (born 1989), English cricketer
Alexander Blake (martyr) (1564–1590), English Catholic priest and martyr

See also
Alex Blake (disambiguation)